Elisha Clark (September 22, 1752—December 12, 1838) was a Vermont veteran of the American Revolution who was active in government, including serving as the state's first Auditor of Accounts.

Biography
Clark was born in Norwich, Connecticut on September 22, 1752.

He served in the Revolution, receiving a pension for service as a Sergeant under Seth Warner with the Green Mountain Boys and as Adjutant under Colonel Samuel Herrick in the Vermont Militia.  He also served as a commissary and deputy commissary of issues.

He settled in Tinmouth, Vermont and served in several local offices, including Justice of the Peace.

Clark served as Rutland County Probate Judge from 1784 to 1803.

He was Vermont's first Auditor of Accounts, serving from 1790 to 1797.

Death and burial
Clark died in Tinmouth on December 12, 1838.  He was buried in Tinmouth's Noble Family Cemetery.

Family
Clark was married three times.  With first wife Mary Stewart he had a daughter named Polly.  With second wife Betsey Jewell, the widow of David Spofford, he had two sons—Elisha, Jr. and Harry.  His third wife was Edna Mattocks (1767-1847).  Their children included: Harry Clark (1786-1846); Edny M. Clark (1794-1816); Albert S. Clark (1802-1864); and Burr R. Clark (1803-1882).

References

1752 births
1838 deaths
People of Vermont in the American Revolution
Vermont militiamen in the American Revolution
Military history of Vermont
State Auditors of Vermont
Politicians from Norwich, Connecticut
People from Tinmouth, Vermont
People of pre-statehood Vermont
Burials in Vermont
American justices of the peace
Military personnel from Norwich, Connecticut